Donald Hodge may refer to:
 Donald Hodge (basketball) (born 1969), American basketball player
 Donald Hodge (veteran) (1894–1997), English World War I veteran